Olli Jalonen (born February 21, 1954 in Helsinki, is a Finnish author. His debut book was published in 1978 and since that he has published over 20 books (mostly novels and short story collections) and drama. Some of his novels have been translated into German, Swedish, Norwegian, Estonian and Latvian, and short stories in different languages.

Biography 

Jalonen lives in Hämeenlinna, Finland. He has studied Social Sciences (M.A. and L.Soc.Sc) and Literature (Ph.D) and has worked in journalism before becoming a full-time writer in 1981. Olli Jalonen studied at the University of Tampere 1973-2006 and also at Trinity College Dublin 1979–1980.

He took part in the International Writing Program IWP at the University of Iowa in 1982 and was the first Writer-in-Residence of Zurich, Switzerland, in 2010–2011. Olli Jalonen has received several literary awards since his debut book, including the Finlandia Fiction Prize in 1990 for his novel Isäksi ja tyttäreksi and again in 2018 for his novel Taivaanpallo, the J. H. Erkko Prize for the best debut book in 1978 and the Eino Leino Prize in 1990. He has had three nominations for the Nordic Council Literature Prize

It has been said that Olli Jalonen's writing shows a delight in playing with the nature of reality. One of the trademarks of his work as a prosewriter is his desire to bring together his earlier works to form part of new, larger entities, thus making his texts comment upon one another.

For decades he has been interested in the island of St. Helena and the astronomer and scientist Edmond Halley (1656-1742). For instance Jalonen's novel 14 solmua Greenwichiin (14 Knots to Greenwich, Otava 2008) centres on the story of a fictional round-the-world race by land and sea that starts and ends in Greenwich. It moves between suspense fiction and autobiography in an unusual and often enigmatic way. The novel Taivaanpallo (The Celestial Sphere, Otava 2018) tells about the rays of the Enlightenment and life on St. Helena and London in the 1680s. The story of Edmond Halley and his trusted apprentice Angus continues in Merenpeitto (The Art of Living under Water, Otava 2019).

Works

Novels and short story collections

Other books

References

1954 births
Living people
Writers from Helsinki
Finnish writers
International Writing Program alumni
Finlandia Prize winners
Recipients of the Eino Leino Prize